The 2008 Armenian First League season began on 5 April 2008 and ended on 14 November 2008. At the end of 28 rounds, Shengavit were crowned champions; however, they were not eligible for promotion since they were the reserve team of Ulisses, which already participated in the Armenian Premier League.

Overview 
 Shengavit entered the competition representing the reserves of Ulisses FC.

League table

Top goalscorers

See also 
 2008 Armenian Premier League
 2008 Armenian Cup

External links 
 RSSSF: Armenia 2008 - Second Level

Armenian First League seasons
2
Armenia
Armenia